Calamotropha zoma is a moth in the family Crambidae. It was described by Viette in 1971. It is found in Madagascar.

References

Crambinae
Moths described in 1971